The TASF reagent or tris(dimethylamino)sulfonium difluorotrimethylsilicate is a reagent in organic chemistry with structural formula [((CH3)2N)3S]+[F2Si(CH3)3]−.  It is an anhydrous source of fluoride and is used to cleave silyl ether protective groups.  Many other fluoride reagents are known, but few are truly anhydrous, because of the extraordinary basicity of "naked" F−.  In TASF, the fluoride is masked as an adduct with the weak Lewis acid trimethylsilylfluoride (FSi(CH3)3).  The sulfonium cation ((CH3)2N)3S+ is unusually non-electrophilic due to the electron-donating properties of the three (CH3)2N substituents.

This compound is prepared from sulfur tetrafluoride:
3 (CH3)2NSi(CH3)3  +  SF4  →  2 (CH3)3SiF  + [((CH3)2N)3S]+[F2Si(CH3)3]−
The colorless salt precipitates from the reaction solvent, diethyl ether.

Structure
The cation [((CH3)2N)3S]+ is a sulfonium ion. The S-N distances are 1.612 and 1.675 pm.  The N-S-N angles are 99.6°.  The anion is [F2Si(CH3)3]−.  It is trigonal bipyramidal with mutually trans fluorides.  The Si-F distances are 176 picometers.  The Si-C distances are 188 pm.

References

Reagents for organic chemistry
Fluorides
Dimethylamino compounds